The Kashveti Church of St. George is a Georgian Orthodox Church in central Tbilisi, located across from the Parliament building on Rustaveli Avenue.

The Kashveti church was constructed between 1904 and 1910 by the architect Leopold Bilfeldt, who based his design on the medieval Samtavisi Cathedral. The construction was sponsored by the Georgian nobility and bourgeoisie. Kashveti was built on the site of a damaged church built of brick at the request of the Amilakhvari family in 1753. Significant contributions to the current church's ornate design were made by N. Agladze. Kashveti's frescoes were painted by the influential Georgian painter, Lado Gudiashvili, in 1947.

The name "kashveti" is derived from Georgian words kva for a "stone" and shva "to give birth." Legend has it the prominent 6th century monk David of Gareja of the Thirteen Assyrian Fathers was accused by a woman of making her a pregnant in Tbilisi. David prophesied his denial would be proved when she gave birth to a stone. She did, and the place received the name of "kashveti".

Burials
 Ivane Amilakhvari
 Grigol Orbeliani
 David Sarajishvili

References
 Beridze, V. "Kashveti." Georgian Soviet Encyclopedia. Vol. 10, Tbilisi, 1986, pp. 495

Georgian Orthodox churches in Tbilisi
Churches completed in 1910
20th-century Eastern Orthodox church buildings
Tourist attractions in Tbilisi